Thialf is an ice arena in Heerenveen, Netherlands. Thialf consists of the Thialf-hal (a 12,500-capacity speed skating venue) and the Elfstedenhal (a 2,500-capacity ice hockey venue). Thialf is used for long track speed skating, short track speed skating, ice hockey, figure skating, ice speedway, and non-sporting events. The outdoor rink was opened in 1967, and the indoor stadium was opened in 1986. Several world records have been set in the indoor stadium.

Annually, Thialf hosts two Speed Skating World Cup events. Jan de Jong was the ice rink master at Thialf for many years.

History

Thialf is named after Thialfi, a character in Norse mythology, who was Thor's servant and had to race a giant.

Construction on the artificial outdoor ice rink was started in 1966, and it was opened on 14 October 1967 by Princess Christina of the Netherlands. It was the third 400m artificial ice rink in the Netherlands, after the Jaap Eden baan in Amsterdam and the IJsselstadion in Deventer. Several national and international tournaments have been held in Thialf, but only one world record has been set on the outdoor rink, by Andrea Schöne on the 5000 m in 1983.

The roofed stadium, which seats 12,500 people, opened on 17 November 1986, about a year after Sportforum Hohenschönhausen in Berlin, which was the first 400m indoor speed skating oval in the world. Thanks to the indoor conditions, allowing climate control, almost all world speed skating records were broken at Thialf in the first season. Since 1988 it has been overtaken as the "fastest ice in the world" by the high-altitude indoor rinks in Calgary and Salt Lake City, which have the additional benefit of low air pressure.

Every year there are main skating events like the Dutch, European and World championships, and one or two Speed Skating World Cup events in Thialf.

The 2500-seat ice hockey arena adjacent to the speed skating oval is the home arena of the Heerenveen Flyers, one of the Netherlands' most successful ice hockey clubs. It is also the main arena used in the Netherlands for international ice hockey tournaments, hosting the IIHF World U18 Championships (Division II, Group A) in late March 2012.

The stadium was renovated in 2016.

Long track speed skating

Events 
 Dutch championships

 * Dutch allround 1968: only for women.
 * Dutch sprint: 1969, 1973, 1979, 1982: only for men.

 European championships

 World championships

 World Cup

Track records
These are the current track records in Thialf.

World records
The following world records were set in Thialf.

Other events
The arena has hosted concerts by many famous artists, including Whitney Houston, Tina Turner, André Rieu, TOTO, Trance Energy and Prince, among others.

Also, the national Miss Universe competition was held in Thialf several times.

See also
 List of indoor arenas in the Netherlands
 List of indoor speed skating rinks

References

External links

 
 Track records

Indoor arenas in the Netherlands
Indoor ice hockey venues in the Netherlands
Speed skating venues in the Netherlands
Indoor speed skating venues
Sports venues completed in 1967
Sports venues in Heerenveen
1967 establishments in the Netherlands
20th-century architecture in the Netherlands